An Essay on Man is a poem published by Alexander Pope in 1733–1734. It was dedicated to Henry St John, 1st Viscount Bolingbroke, (pronounced 'Bull-en-brook') hence the opening line: "Awake, St John...".  It is an effort to rationalize or rather "vindicate the ways of God to man" (l.16), a variation of John Milton's claim in the opening lines of Paradise Lost, that he will "justifie the wayes of God to men" (1.26). It is concerned with the natural order God has decreed for man. Because man cannot know God's purposes, he cannot complain about his position in the great chain of being (ll.33-34) and must accept that "Whatever is, is right" (l.292), a theme that was satirized by Voltaire in Candide (1759). More than any other work, it popularized optimistic philosophy throughout England and the rest of Europe.

Pope's Essay on Man and Moral Epistles were designed to be the parts of a system of ethics which he wanted to express in poetry. Moral Epistles has been known under various other names including Ethic Epistles and Moral Essays.

On its publication, An Essay on Man received great admiration throughout Europe. Voltaire called it "the most beautiful, the most useful, the most sublime didactic poem ever written in any language". In 1756 Rousseau wrote to Voltaire admiring the poem and saying that it "softens my ills and brings me patience". Kant was fond of the poem and would recite long passages from it to his students.

Later however, Voltaire renounced his admiration for Pope's and Leibniz's optimism and even wrote a novel, Candide, as a satire on their philosophy of ethics. Rousseau also critiqued the work, questioning "Pope's uncritical assumption that there must be an unbroken chain of being all the way from inanimate matter up to God."

The essay, written in heroic couplets, comprises four epistles. Pope began work on it in 1729, and had finished the first three by 1731. They appeared in early 1733, with the fourth epistle published the following year. The poem was originally published anonymously; Pope did not admit authorship until 1735.

Pope reveals in his introductory statement, "The Design", that An Essay on Man was originally conceived as part of a longer philosophical poem which would have been expanded on through four separate books. According to his friend and editor, William Warburton, Pope intended to structure the work as follows:

The four epistles which had already been published would have comprised the first book. The second book was to contain another set of epistles, which in contrast to the first book would focus on subjects such as human reason, the practical and impractical aspects of varied arts and sciences, human talent, the use of learning, the science of the world, and wit, together with "a satire against the misapplication" of those same disciplines. The third book would discuss politics and religion, while the fourth book was concerned with "private ethics" or "practical morality." The following passage, taken from the first two paragraphs of the opening verse of the second epistle, is often quoted by those familiar with Pope's work, as it neatly summarizes some of the religious and humanistic tenets of the poem:

In the above example, Pope's thesis is that man has learnt about nature and God's creation through science; consequently, science has given man power, but having become intoxicated by this power, man has begun to think that he is "imitating God". In response, Pope declares the species of man to be a "fool", absent of knowledge and plagued by "ignorance" in spite of all the progress achieved through science. Pope argues that humanity should make a study of itself, and not debase the spiritual essence of the world with earthly science, since the two are diametrically opposed to one another: man should "presume not God to scan".

Notes

External links 

 An Essay on Man at the Eighteenth-Century Poetry Archive (ECPA)
 Full text at Project Gutenberg
 
Essay on Man/Essay on Woman - UK Parliament Living Heritage
 An introduction to the poem from a Hartwicke College professor: 
 Pope- Essay on Man -complete text
 Selected Poetry of Alexander Pope, Representative Poetry Online, hosted by University of Toronto Libraries

1734 poems
British poems
Works by Alexander Pope
Modern philosophical literature
Ethics literature